Prior to its uniform adoption of proportional representation in 1999, the United Kingdom used first-past-the-post for the European elections in England, Scotland and Wales. The European Parliament constituencies used under that system were smaller than the later regional constituencies and only had one Member of the European Parliament each.

The constituency of Birmingham East was one of them.

It consisted of the Westminster Parliament constituencies of Birmingham Edgbaston, Birmingham Erdington, Birmingham Hall Green, Birmingham Hodge Hill, Birmingham Northfield, Birmingham Selly Oak, Birmingham Small Heath, Birmingham Sparkbrook, and Birmingham Yardley.

MEPs

Elections

References

External links
 David Boothroyd's United Kingdom Election Results 

European Parliament constituencies in England (1979–1999)
Politics of Birmingham, West Midlands
1984 establishments in England
1999 disestablishments in England
Constituencies established in 1984
Constituencies disestablished in 1999